The Clatsop County Courthouse is a historic courthouse in Astoria, Clatsop County, Oregon, United States.

The courthouse was listed on the National Register of Historic Places in 1984.

See also
National Register of Historic Places listings in Clatsop County, Oregon

References

External links

1908 establishments in Oregon
County courthouses in Oregon
Courthouses on the National Register of Historic Places in Oregon
Edgar M. Lazarus buildings
Government buildings completed in 1908
Historic district contributing properties in Oregon
National Register of Historic Places in Astoria, Oregon